The Hamburg Marathon is an annual marathon race over the classic distance of  held in Hamburg, Germany. In 2009, 13,938 participants were counted.  The marathon is categorized as a Gold Label Road Race by World Athletics.

History 

The first edition took place in 1986 with about 8,000 participants. The Hamburg Marathon was named for the sponsoring companies Hansemarathon (1986–1990), Shell-hanse-Marathon (1991–1997), Shell-Marathon (1998–1999), Hansaplast-Marathon (2000–2002), Olympus-Marathon (2003–2005), Conergy Marathon (2006–2008) and 2009–2010 Möbel Kraft Marathon Hamburg, with 13.938 participants. Several championships are integrated in the marathon, the Hamburg Championships, the Hamburger Betriebssport- Meisterschaften, the Hamburger Polizei- Meisterschaften. In 1988, 1995 and 1999, the German Championships, and in 2006 and 2007, the German Championships for the blind and partially sighted were competed during the Hamburg Marathon.

It is one of Germany's largest road running competitions and a total of 15,174 runners participated in the 25th edition in 2010. The record participation for the event came in 2005 when a total of 17,502 runners completed the course.

Internals disagreements within the organising group and pull-outs from high-profile sponsors affected the race between 2009 and 2011. A new organising group was established for the 2012 race and Hamburger Sparkasse ("Haspa", a regional bank) became the title sponsor. This coincided with a resurgence in the elite level race, as both men's and women's course records were broken.

The 2020 edition of the race was postponed to 2021 due to the coronavirus pandemic, with all entries automatically remaining valid for 2021.

Winners 
Key:

Notes

References 

List of winners

External links
 Official website
 Marathon Info

Recurring sporting events established in 1986
Marathons in Germany
Marathon
Annual sporting events in Germany
Spring (season) events in Germany
Inline speed skating competitions